Arthur Brough (born Frederick Arthur Baker; 26 February 1905 – 28 May 1978) was a British actor and theatre founder, producer and director best known for portraying the character of bumbling senior menswear salesman Ernest Grainger on the BBC TV sitcom Are You Being Served?

Biography

Early life
The diminutive actor originally wanted to become a teacher, but failed to gain such employment, and worked in a solicitor's office. He found this job too mundane and he began to take an interest in the theatre. After indulging in amateur theatricals, Brough attended the Royal Academy of Dramatic Art in the mid-1920s. After graduating, he joined a Shakespearean theatrical troupe, where he met his wife-to-be, actress Elizabeth Addyman. After they married, they used their wedding dowry as collateral to rent the Leas Pavilion, a repertory theatre in Folkestone, Kent. They had one daughter, Joanna, who was educated at Ashford School for Girls.

Theatre impresario
Having used the name The Pioneer Players at Folkestone since 1929, Brough and his wife Elizabeth formed The Arthur Brough Players in 1932. The company helped launch the careers of many prominent actors, including Peter Barkworth, Eric Lander, Polly James, Anne Stallybrass, and Trevor Bannister, who later portrayed Mr. Lucas in "Are You Being Served." Once the Folkestone rep was established, Brough formed new repertory companies in Bradford, Bristol, Blackpool, Keighley, Leeds, Lincoln, Oxford and Southampton, to name a few. With the outbreak of World War II, Brough enlisted in the Royal Navy, where he served for the duration of the war. His service included helping with the evacuation of Dunkirk in 1940, his ship returning to the rescue scene several times to bring soldiers home before the Nazis reached them at the seaport.

Following demobilisation, Brough resumed his acting career and reopened the Folkestone rep. Many prominent actors began their careers with the Arthur Brough Players, including Peter Barkworth, who appeared in The Guinea Pig in 1948: Eric Lander, later a star of the TV series No Hiding Place, in 1949: Polly James in the 1960s: and Anne Stallybrass, who started out as ASM in 1960 and went on to play Ida the maid in Pool's Paradise by Philip King; as well as appearing in The Aspern Papers, Candida, and A Taste of Honey at the little Folkestone theatre. Others included Andrew Jack; Sydney Sturgess, who went on to marry Barry Morse; and Trevor Bannister, who would later act alongside Brough in Are You Being Served?

In those days a local repertory company would present a fresh play each week, to rival the cinemas, with a small stable cast rehearsing one play by day, whilst performing what they had rehearsed the previous week each evening, with a mid-week 'tea' matinee. Since there was a limited number of actors in the company for economic reasons, they often had to play characters far from their own age or appearance. Brough took his company on tour, and helped establish rep companies in Aldershot, Southend and Eastbourne.

Television
With the rise of television, Brough predicted the eclipse of repertory theatre as a viable entertainment form. In the 1960s he began seeking roles in the mass media, appearing in small roles in films and television. His daughter, Joanna Hutton, said this about his forecast of the decline of repertory theatre: "He was very astute and unsentimental about it. He realized the era was over and that he must diversify". According to Hutton, her father first found it hard adjusting from stage to screen. "He realized how hammy he was. He used to take the mickey out of himself; he'd always acted in a Shakespearean manner and suddenly realized he had to tone down his performance for film".

One of the first jobs Brough did away from the stage was the film The Green Man with Alastair Sim, in which he played the landlord of the eponymous hotel. He had a minor role opposite Jayne Mansfield in The Challenge (1960), and made guest appearances in TV shows such as Upstairs, Downstairs (Episode 3.2), Dad's Army, Z-Cars, The Persuaders, Adam Adamant Lives!, Randall and Hopkirk (Deceased) and Jason King. He also continued to appear in theatrical productions, including Half a Sixpence (1967), playing a shopkeeper. The Folkestone Rep continued until 1969, before closing at the time that Brough's wife Elizabeth began to suffer ill-health.

Are You Being Served?
In 1972, Brough was cast as Ernest "Mr. Grainger" in the BBC sitcom Are You Being Served? by Jeremy Lloyd and David Croft. Initially a pilot episode in the Comedy Playhouse slot, it was well received and commissioned for a series in early 1973. Set in a fading fictional department store, Brough played the senior menswear salesman, alongside his assistants Mr. Humphries (John Inman) and Mr Lucas (Trevor Bannister). The show ran until 1985.

After the show completed its fifth series in 1977, on 22 March 1978, Arthur Brough's wife of almost 50 years, Elizabeth, died, and the emotionally devastated Brough announced he was quitting acting. Brough stayed with his daughter for a few weeks following his wife's death and, according to his daughter, Jeremy Lloyd and David Croft made contact to say they were writing him into the next series. However, he died just two months after his wife, on 28 May 1978, in Folkestone. Croft decided not to have another actor take over the part of Mr. Grainger, so his character in Are You Being Served? was replaced by Mr. Tebbs, played by James Hayter.

Related family life 
Brough's daughter, Joanna Hutton (who died in 2002), became the first female curator of the Brontë Parsonage Museum in Haworth for a period in the 1960s.

His twin brother owned and operated Bakers the Butchers on Petersfield High Street for many years.

Credits
Arthur Brough dedicated his life to the theatre, and Are You Being Served? co-star Mollie Sugden credited him with helping train a generation of actors. His colleagues have fond memories of working with Brough, who, as his daughter noted, "was a highly respected actor who'd spent forty years in the profession." At the time of his death, David Croft said: "Arthur created a living character who was the inspiration for much of the humour. His personality made him a pivot round which a whole lot of laughter and affection revolved."

With a mischievous sense of humour, he would often pull pranks on the rest of the cast during recordings. Despite this, however, Trevor Bannister held him in very high regard, saying of him that he was a "wicked old man but a wonderful man." David Croft recalls the time Arthur would disappear from the set. 'Whenever we were rehearsing he'd vanish at about three minutes to eleven. For a while we wondered where he went, but eventually discovered that he'd nip next door to the pub for a quick Pink Gin. We'd watch from the window as this little figure hurled towards the pub – we never spoke to him about it. One day when he returned, John Inman asked where he'd been. He made some excuse, but what he'd forgotten was that it was pouring with rain and his bald head was soaking wet!'

Filmography

References

External links

1905 births
1978 deaths
Alumni of RADA
People educated at Churcher's College
People from Petersfield
Royal Navy personnel of World War II
Royal Navy sailors
English male stage actors
English male television actors
20th-century English male actors
Male actors from Hampshire
English theatre managers and producers
British male comedy actors
20th-century English businesspeople
Military personnel from Hampshire